Nelzhichi is a rural locality (a village) in Pochepsky District, Bryansk Oblast, Russia. The population was 106 as of 2013. There are 2 streets.

Geography 
Nelzhichi is located 24 km southwest of Pochep (the district's administrative centre) by road. Moskovsky is the nearest rural locality.

References 

Rural localities in Pochepsky District